In different branches of mathematics, primitive polynomial may refer to:
 Primitive polynomial (field theory), a minimal polynomial of an extension of finite fields
 Primitive polynomial (ring theory), a polynomial with coprime coefficients